The following highways are numbered 229:

Canada
 Manitoba Provincial Road 229
 Prince Edward Island Route 229
 Quebec Route 229
 Saskatchewan Highway 229

Costa Rica
 National Route 229

India
 National Highway 229 (India)

Japan
 Japan National Route 229

United States
 Interstate 229
 Alabama State Route 229
 California State Route 229
 Connecticut Route 229
 Florida State Road 229 (former)
 Georgia State Route 229 (former)
 Indiana State Road 229
 Iowa Highway 229 (former)
Kentucky Route 229
 Maine State Route 229
 Maryland Route 229
 Nevada State Route 229
 New Mexico State Road 229
 New York State Route 229 (former)
 Ohio State Route 229
 Oregon Route 229
 Pennsylvania Route 229 (former)
 Tennessee State Route 229
 Texas State Highway 229 (former)
 Utah State Route 229 (former)
 Virginia State Route 229